is a passenger railway station located in the city of Komae, Tokyo, Japan, operated by the private railway operator Odakyu Electric Railway.

Lines

Station layout
The elevated station has two side platforms and four tracks. The outermost tracks typically serve local trains that stop at the station. The two innermost tracks allow express trains to bypass the station. The station's building is located underneath the elevated structure. The space under the train tracks on either side of the concourse is occupied by commercial facilities and a bicycle parking area.

History
Izumi-Tamagawa Station was opened on 1 April 1927.

Station numbering was introduced in January 2014 with Izumi-tamagawa being assigned station number OH17.

Passenger statistics
In fiscal 2019, the station had an average of 15,751 passengers daily.

Surrounding area
Komae High School
Tama River

References

External links

 Odakyu station information 

Odakyu Odawara Line
Stations of Odakyu Electric Railway
Railway stations in Tokyo
Railway stations in Japan opened in 1927
Komae, Tokyo